In mathematics, 

is a divergent series, first considered by Euler, that sums the factorials of the natural numbers with alternating signs. Despite being divergent, it can be assigned a value of approximately 0.596347 by Borel summation.

Euler and Borel summation
This series was first considered by Euler, who applied summability methods to assign a finite value to the series. The series is a sum of factorials that are alternately added or subtracted. One way to assign a value to this divergent series is by using Borel summation, where one formally writes

If summation and integration are interchanged (ignoring that neither side converges), one obtains:

The summation in the square brackets converges when , and for those values equals .

 

where E1(z) is the exponential integral. This is by definition the Borel sum of the series.

Connection to differential equations

Consider the coupled system of differential equations

where dots denote derivatives with respect to t.

Observe x(1) is precisely Euler's series.

On the other hand, the system of differential equations has a solution

By successively integrating by parts, the formal power series is  recovered as an asymptotic approximation to this expression for x(t).

See also
 Alternating factorial
 1 + 1 + 1 + 1 + ⋯
 1 − 1 + 1 − 1 + ⋯ (Grandi's)
 1 + 2 + 3 + 4 + ⋯
 1 + 2 + 4 + 8 + ⋯
 1 − 2 + 3 − 4 + ⋯
 1 − 2 + 4 − 8 + ⋯

References

Further reading
 
 
 

Divergent series